"Ballerina Girl" is a 1986 song written and recorded by Lionel Richie. The song is a track from Richie's Dancing on the Ceiling album. "Ballerina Girl" peaked at number five on the soul charts. The song was also the last of Richie's eleven number ones on the Adult Contemporary charts, spending four weeks on top. "Ballerina Girl" peaked at number seven on the Billboard Hot 100 in early 1987.

The song was written for Lionel's adopted daughter, Nicole.

Music video
In the music video Richie plays the song on a piano in a ballet school, while young ballet students dance.

Track listings
7" Single
 
 "Ballerina Girl" - 3:36
 "Deep River Woman" - 4:35

Charts

Weekly charts

Year-end charts

Cover versions
1997: Steve Winwood
2000: Luther Vandross

References

1980s ballads
1986 singles
1987 singles
Lionel Richie songs
Songs written by Lionel Richie
Song recordings produced by James Anthony Carmichael